The Battle of Jammu was fought between Sikhs and the Dogra Rajputs in 1808. The Dogras lost Jammu and Hukam Singh Chimni captured the Jammu city. This was a great success for the Sikhs as now their route to Kashmir was open. Kashmir was later on conquered by Sikhs under Misr Diwan Chand the Army chief of Maharaja Ranjeet Singh in 1819. In 1820, the Sikhs had to install Gulab Singh as the Raja of Jammu and as a vassal to Ranjit Singh because of the growing revolt (led by Mian Dido Jamwal and Chib Rajputs) of the Dogra Rajputs against the Sikhs. Gulab Singh would go on to establish the Dogra dynasty.

Further reading 
 Sun, Sohan Lal, ` Umdat-ut- Twdnkh. Lahore, 1885–89
 Prein Singh, Baba, Khalsa Raj de Usrayye, vol. II. Hoti Mardan,1944
 Griffin, Lepel, and C.F. Massy, Chiefs and Families of Note in the Punjab. Lahore, 1909
 Khushwant Singh, Ranjit Singh: Maharajah of the Punjab. Bombay, 1962
 Panikkar, Gulab Singh 1930

References 

Battles in 1808
Conflicts in 1808
Jammu
Battles involving the Rajputs
Jammu